Pearshape is a rural locality in the local government area (LGA) of King Island in the North-west and west LGA region of Tasmania. The 2016 census recorded a population of nil for the state suburb of Pearshape.

History 
Pearshape is a confirmed locality. It is believed to be so named because of the shape of a lagoon in the area.

Geography
The waters of the Southern Ocean form the western boundary.

Road infrastructure 
An un-numbered route (South Road) runs through from north to south.

References

Towns in Tasmania
King Island (Tasmania)